Leonardo Di Lorenzo (born May 20, 1981 in Buenos Aires) is a retired Argentine footballer. He announced his retirement from football at the age of 39 on 20 January 2021.

Career

South America
Di Lorenzo started playing soccer in the professional ranks in 2000, with San Lorenzo, where he was part of the team that reached the National A Division closing tournament, and helped the club achieve its first international success by winning the Mercosur Cup. Later on he had spells with Atlético Rafaela and Argentinos Juniors.

Canada
Di Lorenzo was spotted by the Montreal Impact head coach Nick De Santis during a scouting trip in Argentina in January 2006, and signed a two-year contract with the USL First Division club. In his first season with the Impact he played in 19 games and spent 1,427 minutes on the field in regular-season action, making him the busiest Impact player among those into their first USL First Division season, and scored two goals and collected six assists for 10 points making him the second highest total among Impact players after Mauricio Salles. Helped the Impact claim the regular-season title as well as the Voyageurs Cup, and he won the Impact's Newcomer of the Year award.

In his second season Di Lorenzo was one of the 13 players in the league who played all 28 regular-season games. He ended the season with three goals and four assists for 10 points, and earned a spot in the 2007 USL First Division Second All-league Team for a second straight season. He was also named five times to the USL First Division Team of the Week. At the team's annual awards banquet he was awarded the Giuseppe-Saputo Trophy as the Impact's MVP. Impact's head coach, De Santis said of him "Leonardo came to training camp in perfect shape and it gave him the chance to be constant all season long. He was a key player during 28 games. After only two seasons, he is already part of the team's nucleus". During the 2008 USL season Di Lorenzo played in 24 matches for the Impact, and recorded three goals as well two assists. In the 2008 Canadian Championship he appeared in all four matches for the Impact. He helped the Impact qualify for the first time for the CONCACAF Champions League by winning the Canadian Championship. He was also  selected to the USL First Division Second All-Star Team for a third consecutive season. During the 2009 USL season Di Lorenzo contributed by helping the Impact clinch a playoff spot under new head coach Marc Dos Santos. He helped the Impact reach the finals where Montreal would face the Vancouver Whitecaps FC, this marking the first time in USL history where the final match would consist of two Canadian clubs. In the final he helped the Impact win the series 6-3 on aggregate. The victory gave the Impact their third USL Championship and also the victory marked his first USL Championship.

Di Lorenzo signed a new two-year contract with Montreal on 30 January 2010. On July 18, 2010, marked his 100-game appearance for the organization, he managed to score his 10th career goal in the same match against Crystal Palace Baltimore. Throughout the season he led his team in assists, and managed to become one of the five Montreal players to record 2,000 minutes.

Honours

Montreal Impact
USL First Division Championship (1): 2009

Career stats

References

External links

Argentine Primera statistics at Futbol XXI 

1981 births
Living people
Argentine footballers
Argentine expatriate footballers
Footballers from Buenos Aires
Ottawa Fury (2005–2013) players
San Lorenzo de Almagro footballers
Argentinos Juniors footballers
Atlético de Rafaela footballers
Deportes Concepción (Chile) footballers
Club Atlético Acassuso footballers
Club Atlético Temperley footballers
Primera B de Chile players
Argentine Primera División players
Expatriate footballers in Chile
Expatriate soccer players in Canada
Argentine expatriate sportspeople in Canada
Argentine expatriate sportspeople in Chile
Association football midfielders
Montreal Impact (1992–2011) players
North American Soccer League players
USL First Division players
USL League Two players
USSF Division 2 Professional League players